Manasses is a masculine given name of ancient Hebrew origin.

Manasses, Manasseh, or Menashe may also refer to:

 Manasseh (tribal patriarch), first son of Joseph
 Tribe of Manasseh, one of the Tribes of Israel
 Plain of Manasseh, a geographical region in northern Israel
 Prayer of Manasseh, penitential prayer of king Manasseh of Judah
 Menashe (surname), including a list of people with the name

Music
 Manassas (band), a 1970s musical group featuring Stephen Stills
 Manassas (album), a 1972, debut LP album, featuring Stephen Stills and the band of the same name

Location
 Manassas, Virginia

See also
 Manassas (disambiguation)